The 3rd Brigade Combat Team, 10th Mountain Division is an infantry brigade combat team of the United States Army based at Fort Polk, Louisiana. Since its activation in 2004, the brigade has deployed four times to Afghanistan in support of Operation Enduring Freedom. In 2014, the brigade inactivated at Fort Drum, NY, and its infantry battalions were reassigned to other brigades while its special troops battalion, field artillery battalion, brigade support battalion and cavalry squadron were inactivated. The brigade reactivated at Fort Polk, LA in 2015 by reflagging the assets of the 4th Brigade Combat Team, 10th Mountain Division, which was inactivated. The infantry, cavalry and field artillery battalions of the 4th Brigade were reassigned to the 3rd Brigade. The brigade deployed to Iraq in 2017 in support of Operation Inherent Resolve. Recently, the brigade deployed to the Southwest Border in 2019 in support of Operation Faithful Patriot.

From 2016 to 2019, while still part of the 10th Mountain Division, the brigade wore the patch of the 36th Infantry Division through the Army's Associated Unit Pilot program.

3rd BCT "Spartans", 10th MTN DIV (LI) 

The 3rd Brigade Combat Team, 10th Mountain Division (LI) was established in September 2004. The six subordinate battalions were first brought together in September 2004 with a specific mission, making them unique among other Army entities: to support Operation Enduring Freedom, which they would go on to do with four deployments to Afghanistan.

The 1st Battalion, 32nd Infantry Regiment; 2nd Battalion, 87th Infantry Regiment; 4th Battalion, 25th Artillery Regiment; 3rd Squadron, 71st Cavalry Regiment; 710th Brigade Support Battalion; and 3rd Brigade Special Troops Battalion were brought together to form the Spartans of the 3rd Brigade Combat Team, 10th Mountain Division (LI). They served in both the Regional Command East and the Regional Command South areas of responsibility, a vast area of Afghanistan encompassing approximately 124,000 square miles of a rugged and frequently hostile land.

They first deployed to Afghanistan in February 2006 (Operation Enduring Freedom rotations VII), where they fought the Taliban in the mountainous terrain of the Afghan-Pakistani border. It was during this deployment that SFC Jared C. Monti, of 3rd Squadron, 71st Cavalry Regiment, earned the Medal of Honor while protecting his soldiers from an overwhelming Taliban attack on his unit's position.  When the Spartan Brigade redeployed to Fort Drum after 16 months, the Afghan people nicknamed them "the Tribe of the Crossed Swords".

In January 2009, the Spartan Brigade deployed again to Afghanistan, returning to RC-East, where they were tasked with providing security for the Logar and Wardak provinces as well as the southern entrance to the country's capital. This deployment also resulted in another Spartan Brigade Soldier, Capt. William D. Swenson, being awarded the Medal of Honor for his actions during an intense, six-hour-long battle with insurgents, effectively disrupting their assault.

Not long after, the Spartan Brigade found itself once again being called upon to deploy to Afghanistan. Departing in March 2011, 3rd BCT Soldiers were sent to Kandahar Province. Located in the RC-South area of responsibility, Kandahar is also the birthplace of the Taliban.  The Spartan Soldiers set about conducting both lethal and nonlethal missions to break the insurgent's grip on the province. The missions were conducted under three main operations – "To the River", "To the Core" and "To the Summit", which maintained continuous pressure on the enemy, eventually driving them out of their place of inception. In doing so, the Spartan Brigade advanced farther south than any of the previous coalition forces before their arrival.  The brigade was also responsible for opening 22 schools and three medical clinics, as well as securing and refurbishing more than 50 kilometers of Highway 1, the national highway for southern Afghanistan.

Through it all, the 3rd BCT built upon and reinforced their "" partnership with the Afghan security forces and government leaders.  means "shoulder to shoulder" in the Pashto language. The strengthened ties between the Spartan Brigade and their Afghan partners resulted in a marked increase in the security and governance of an area that had been at war for 30 years.

The Spartan Brigade embarked on its final deployment to Afghanistan in October 2013, not long after the announcement of their inactivation. The 3rd BCT deployed once again to Regional Command East, but this time, as a newly configured security force advise and assist brigade.  An SFAAB differs from a standard brigade combat team in many ways. However, the most notable differences are a considerably smaller number of personnel and the almost total emphasis placed on the utilization of several, highly specialized Security force advise and assist teams, or SFAATs. Although they deployed as a smaller contingent, they assumed responsibility for most of the provinces in the region – among them Wardak, Logar, Ghazni, Khost, Paktia, and Paktika – thus relieving a division-size element.

The brigade partnered with the Afghan National Army's 203rd Corps, sharing their expertise, helping them to grow their capabilities as they continued to assume responsibility for the security of their nation and its people. The Afghans were able to successfully hold a grand council of leaders, also known as a Loya Jirga in Pashto, as well as the Ghazni Islamic festival, which was attended by dignitaries and followers from around the world. The Spartan Brigade also guided the Afghan security forces as they conducted their national presidential election, along with the ensuing run-off election.

Order of battle
When established in 2004, the brigade consisted of:
Headquarters and Headquarters Company
3rd Squadron, 71st Cavalry Regiment
1st Battalion, 32nd Infantry Regiment
2nd Battalion, 87th Infantry Regiment
4th Battalion, 25th Field Artillery Regiment
3rd Brigade's Special Troops Battalion
710th Brigade Support Battalion

In February 2014, the brigade inactivated most of its elements at Fort Drum, and reflagged using the assets of the 4th Brigade Combat Team, 10th Mountain Division at Fort Polk, Louisiana. Most of the assigned battalions of the 4th Brigade were reassigned to the 3rd Brigade. The 3rd Brigade currently consists of:
Headquarters and Headquarters Company
3rd Squadron, 89th Cavalry Regiment
2nd Battalion, 2nd Infantry Regiment
2nd Battalion, 4th Infantry Regiment
2nd Battalion, 30th Infantry Regiment
5th Battalion, 25th Field Artillery Regiment
317th Brigade Engineer Battalion
710th Brigade Support Battalion

As part of the US Army's reorganization to provide each brigade combat team with a third maneuver battalion, the 2nd Battalion, 2nd Infantry Regiment joined the brigade.

Lineage and honors

Lineage
Constituted 16 September 2004 in the Regular Army as Headquarters, 3d Brigade Combat Team, 10th Mountain Division, and activated at Fort Drum, New York

Campaign participation credit
War on Terrorism: Afghanistan: Consolidation I; Additional Campaigns to be determined

Decorations
Meritorious Unit Commendation (Army), Streamer Embroidered AFGHANISTAN 2006-2007
Meritorious Unit Commendation (Army), Streamer Embroidered AFGHANISTAN 2009
Meritorious Unit Commendation (Army) for the period 31 October 2013 to 19 July 2014
Meritorious Unit Commendation (Army), Streamer Embroidered AFGHANISTAN 2015-2016

References

External links

 Fort Drum and the 10th Mountain Division Home Page  – official site.
 Lineage and Honors Information: 4th Brigade Combat Team, 10th Infantry Division 
 3rd Brigade, 10th Mountain Division official Facebook Page
 https://twitter.com/3_10MTNPatriots
 https://www.flickr.com/photos/97780128@N02/sets/

M 010 03
M 010 03
10th Mountain Division (United States)
Military units and formations established in 2004